Soldner can refer to:

Johann Georg von Soldner
Soldner constant
Paul Soldner
Söldner: Secret Wars